Amitabh Thakur, a former 1992 batch Uttar Pradesh cadre Indian Police Service (IPS) officer and a social activist, married to advocate/activist Nutan Thakur, is the President of political party Adhikar Sena.

Early life 

Amitabh Thakur was born on 16 June 1968 at Muzaffarpur, Bihar to Tapeshwar Narain Thakur, an Electrical Engineer and Madhuri Bala, a lecturer in Hindi. He was brought up in Bokaro Steel City in present-day Jharkhand (then a part of Bihar), where he got his Matriculation and Intermediate degree from Kendriya Vidyalaya, No-1, Bokaro Steel City in 1983 and 1985 respectively. He entered IIT Kanpur in 1985 from where he got B. Tech degree in mechanical engineering in year 1989. He also has a Fellow Program in Management (FPM) Degree from IIM Lucknow, equivalent to Doctor of Philosophy (P Hd), which he got in year 2015 for his thesis work on UP Police.

Police career 

After B Tech, Thakur took the Civil Services Examination where he first got into Indian Revenue Service in 1991, followed by getting into Indian Police Service the next year. He began his police career in 1992. He got his initial field training in Kanpur district, followed by his posting in Gorakhpur, where he had his initial clashes with Yogi Adityanath, who later became Chief Minister of Uttar Pradesh. He worked as Superintendent of Police (SP) in around 10 districts of UP including Pithoragarh, Lalitpur, Deoria, Gonda, Basti, Sant Kabir Nagar, Firozabad, Ballia and Maharajganj. He also worked in multiple departments including Intelligence, Vigilance, Anti-Corruption and Police Training Academy. Thakur was directly promoted from the rank of SP to Inspector General (IG) in 2012 December, because his promotion as DIG had been held due to framed inquiries against him.

Important Events in Police Career 

In 2005, Amitabh was suspended while posted as the superintendent of police (SP) at Gonda. He was accused of issuing an arms licence to criminals. He defended himself arguing that he only cleared the files that had been already vetted by other officers and the district administration. Later, an enquiry held by IAS officer D Diptivilas found that Thakur was not at all on fault and he had been falsely accused. 

In 2006, as SP of Firozabad district, Thakur transferred the then Jasrana police station in-charge for serious dereliction of duty, which led to fierce altercation with Ramvir Singh Yadav, a Samajwadi Party leader and then MLA,who was strongly backing this officer. Thakur refused to oblige. Some days later, Thakur came to Yadav's native village Paidath, to review the security arrangements for a state minister's visit to the village. There, Yadav and his supporters allegedly threatened and manhandled him over Trivedi's transfer. Thakur got a First Information Report (FIR) registered in this matter at Eka police station, despite strong directions of then Uttar Pradesh Chief Minister Mulayam Singh Yadav, not to register any case in this matter. Ramvir was later exonerate by the Court, after the witnesses against him backtracked during their oral evidence. 

In April 2008, Thakur was selected for the four-year Fellow Programme in Management (FPM) at IIM Lucknow. He approached the Government to grant him a study leave for the course and later approached the Lucknow Bench of Central Administrative Tribunal in April 2009. The Tribunal ordered the state government to make a decision on his leave request, to which the government rejected Thakur's request for study leave, on false pretext of lack of IPS officers. Thakur then again approached the Tribunal and got Extra-ordinary leave (i.e., leave without salary). He joined IIM Lucknow, completed his FPM course and kept on pursuing his Study leave case, which he won first from the Central Administrative Tribunal and later also from Allahabad High Court, after which the State Government was forced to give his the entire salary for this period. This study leave case is regarded as an important struggle in service matter issues.

In December 2014, Thakur's wife Nutan Thakur filed a complaint against the state's mining minister Gayatri Prasad Prajapati, before the Lok Ayukta (anti-corruption ombudsman). She alleged that the minister was involved in illegal mining activities. Thakur approached the Central Government, seeking protection for his family.

In January 2015, a woman filed a rape case against Amitabh Thakur, while he was posted as IG (Civil Defence). The woman alleged that Nutan Thakur promised her assistance in getting a government job, and asked her to come to the Thakurs' residence in Gomti Nagar, where she was allegedly raped. The Thakurs dismissed the complaint as bogus, saying that it had been filed and framed in response to Nutan's complaint against the minister, and that the complainant was related to a Samajwadi Party leader.

On 10 July 2015, Thakur got a phone call from the state's former Chief Minister and Samajwadi Party leader Mulayam Singh Yadav. Later Thakur alleged that Yadav had threatened him over the phone call. He released the audio of the phone call, in which Yadav is allegedly heard saying certain sentences of threatening nature: Thakur alleged that Mulayam Singh was unhappy about the complaint lodged by his wife Nutan against the state minister Gayatri Prasad Prajapati.

11 July 2015, Thakur presented a complaint before Hazratganj police station for registration of FIR against Mulayam Singh as regards the alleged phone threat, which the Police refused to register.

On the contrary, in the same night of 11 July, a rape case was registered against Thakur by the Lucknow police at Gomtinagar police station, based on the complaint filed in January. Two days later, on 13 July, the state government suspended Thakur, accusing him of "indiscipline, holding anti-government views, dereliction of duty and violating service rules". The government also alleged that he had misused government resources and given incomplete information about his assets in his annual declaration of property, which the government hasn't been able to prove yet.

Almost immediately after this, a complaint was presented against Thakur before Lokayukta, UP alleging that Thakur had amassed huge wealth, and a probe was sought into the matter. The then Lokayukta sent a report to State Government, which Thakur alleged to be a biased report under Government pressure. A Vigilance enquiry was also initiated against Thakur at the same time, in which the Vigilance Department recommended registration of FIR against him. An FIR for Disproportionate Assets was registered against Thakur at Thana Gomtinagar.

Investigations were held in both the rape case and Disproportionate assets case and both the charges proved to be incorrect. In the rape case, the Police not only exonerated Thakur, it also charged the complainant of registering a false FIR. Similarly, in the Disproportionate assets case, the investigating agency, the Economic Offences Wing (EOW), concluded that the charges were incorrect and Thakur had property much lesser than his known sources of income.

Compulsory Retirement 

Thakur was given compulsory retirement in March 2021, along with 02 other IPS officers of Uttar Pradesh Cadre, with 07 years of his service still left. Thakur called this an act of political vendetta and alleged that he was being retired merely for his activism and honest working.

Arrest 

In August 2021, Thakur announced that he would be contesting forthcoming Assembly elections against Chief Minister Yogi Adityanath. Almost immediately after this, he was arrested in August 2021,. He was granted bail in March 2022 and came out of Jail on Bail almost immediately after the Assembly result.

Activism

Anti-corruption 

Amitabh Thakur is the founder of the National RTI Forum, a grassroots anti-corruption organisation in India that advocates for government openness under the terms of the 2005 Right to Information Act. The organisation is based in Lucknow.

Human rights 

Thakur had formed Institute for Research and Documentation in Social Sciences (IRDS), a human rights organisation. He recorded the dying declaration of journalist Jagendra Singh; the video allegedly indicated the involvement of a state's minister in Singh's death.

Other issues 

In January 2011, Thakur filed an FIR against Facebook and some of its users, for offensive comments against Mahatma Gandhi in a Facebook group called "I hate Gandhi". Facebook banned the group a couple of days later.

PILs 

Amitabh Thakur and his wife Nutan have filed over 500 RTI applications and 150 Public Interest Litigations (PILs). A number of PILs filed by the Thakurs resulted in action.

As a writer 

Thakur has authored a story book in Hindi, Dhal Gayi Raat, and has compiled two collections of poems Jaisa Maine Jana Hai and Aatmadarsh.  His book Fresh Brew - Chronicles of Business and Freedom, co-authored with Amit Haralalka, traces the careers of 25 IIM Lucknow alumni who turned entrepreneurs. His book Cyber Crime (Hindi साइबर क्राइम) co-authored with S H Zaidi is possibly the first book on Cyber Crime in Hindi.

Personal life 

Amitabh Thakur is married to Nutan Thakur, an advocate and a social activist. He has a brother Avinash Kumar, who is an IAS officer in Jharkhand.   Amitabh has two children - a daughter named Tanaya and a son named Aditya, both law graduates. While Tanaya graduated from National Law University Patna and is an assistant Professor in Law in Shiv Nadar University, Aditya graduated from National Law University Lucknow.

See also 
 Nutan Thakur, Advocate, activist and active member, Adhikar Sena

References

Living people
Indian Police Service officers
Indian police officers
Uttar Pradesh Police
People from Muzaffarpur
Indian anti-corruption activists
IIT Kanpur alumni
Indian Institute of Management Lucknow alumni
Activists from Bihar
All India Services
Year of birth missing (living people)